Mark Ritchie may refer to:
Mark Ritchie (politician), Minnesota Secretary of State, 2007–2015
Mark Ritchie (pinball designer) (born 1958), American pinball designer
Mark Ritchie (trader) (born 1956), American commodities trader